Roridomyces praeclarus is a species of fungus in the genus Roridomyces, family Mycenaceae.

Taxonomy
The species was originally named Mycena praeclara by Egon Horak in 1978.

Description
Its color is deep orange to reddish-orange, fading with age. The cap center is granular, dry, with indistinct grooves extending towards the margin. The gills have an arcuate to decurrent attachment to the stipe. They are white with a smooth edge that is the same color as the rest of the gill. It has pale orange coloration towards base, and is slimy when wet. Fruit bodies grow singly, not in dense groups or clusters. The mushroom has no distinctive odor or taste. The flesh of the cap is pale orange.

Habitat and distribution
The fruit bodies of R. praeclarus grow on rotting leaves and twigs in rain forests of Papua New Guinea.

References

External links

Mycenaceae
Fungi of New Guinea
Fungi described in 1978